Renée Björling (10 July 1898 – 4 March 1975) was a Swedish film actress. She was born in Lovö, Sweden and died in Täby.

Partial filmography

 Tre indvendige Jomfruer (1914) - Daughter
 The Downy Girl (1919) - Anne-Marie Ehinger
 The Monastery of Sendomir (1920) - Dortka
 Carolina Rediviva (1920) - Carola
 Vallfarten till Kevlaar (1921) - Gretchen
 A Wild Bird (1921) - Alice Brenner
 Fröken Fob (1923) - Fob
 Norrtullsligan (1923) - Eva
 Halta Lena och Vindögda Per (1924) - Magda
Charles XII's Courier (1924) - Anna Björnhufvud
 Life in the Country (1924) - Frida von Rambow
 Två konungar (1925) - Ann-Charlotte von Stapelmohr
 Charley's Aunt (1926) - Kitty Werden
 Gustaf Wasa (1928) - Margareta Brahe
 Servant's Entrance (1932) - Astrid Beck
 Vi som går kjøkkenveien (1933) - Astrid, Beck's daughter
 The Fight Continues (1941) - Betty Berg
 Släkten är bäst (1944) - Ebba Ekberg
 I Am Fire and Air (1944) - Miss Schultze
 The Serious Game (1945) - Ester Roslin
 Brita in the Merchant's House (1946) - Hans fru
 Summer Interlude (1951) - Aunt Elisabeth
 Defiance (1952) - Ove and Marianne's mother (uncredited)
 Summer with Monika (1953) - Görans fru (uncredited)
 The Girl from Backafall (1953) - Mrs. Dücker
 The Beat of Wings in the Night (1953) - Else Rönne
 A Lesson in Love (1954) - Svea Erneman
 Simon the Sinner (1954) - Woman Drinking Coffee
 The Girl in the Rain (1955) - Maria, Principal
 Dreams (1955) - Mrs. Berger (uncredited)
 Getting Married (1955) - Woman on carriage (uncredited)
 Så tuktas kärleken (1955) - Mrs. Grinnan
 Det är aldrig för sent (1956) - Jeanne
 Stage Entrance (1956) - Edit Strand
 Night Light (1957) - Mrs. Wilhelmsson
 Woman in a Fur Coat (1958) - Mathilde Croneman
 Heart's Desire (1960) - Aurore, Patrik's Mother
 Kärlekens decimaler (1960) - Mrs. Lind

References

External links

 

1898 births
1975 deaths
Swedish film actresses
Swedish silent film actresses
20th-century Swedish actresses